Rinaldo "Dino" Del Bo (19 November 1916 – 16 January 1991) was an Italian politician who served in the High Authority of the European Coal and Steel Community, serving as President of the body between 9 October 1963 and 1967 as the Del Bo Authority.

Biography 
He was a prominent exponent of the fascist university organizations of Milan, he collaborated in a branch position in magazines such as Gerarchia and Fascist Doctrine. At first close to the fascist current of mysticism, after 8 September 1943 (date of the Armistice of Cassibile), together with Teresio Olivelli, Carlo Bianchi, David Maria Turoldo, Mario Apollonio and Giovanni Barbareschi, took part in the meetings that led to the foundation of the newspaper Il Ribelle. The newspaper of the Brigate Fiamme Verdi was published in 26 issues. One of the printers, Franco Rovida, and Teresio Olivelli himself ended their existence in a concentration camp.

After World War II he was MP for four terms among the Christian Democracy ranks and held various governmental offices, including that of Minister of Foreign Trade in the second Segni government. He organized President Gronchi's trip to the USSR. He was then the fifth president of the ECSC High Authority in the four-year period 1963–1967.

References 

1916 births
1991 deaths
Italian European Commissioners
Grand Crosses with Star and Sash of the Order of Merit of the Federal Republic of Germany
20th-century Italian politicians
Deputies of Legislature I of Italy
Deputies of Legislature II of Italy
Deputies of Legislature III of Italy
Deputies of Legislature IV of Italy
Members of the High Authority of the European Coal and Steel Community